Christiaan Petrus 'Tiaan' Strauss, (born 28 June 1965) is a former rugby union and rugby league footballer who represented both South Africa and Australia at international level in rugby union and also played top-level domestic rugby league in Australia. He won the 1999 Rugby World Cup with Australia and the Currie Cup with Western Province.

Biography

Born in the town of Upington, Cape Province (now Northern Cape), Strauss attended the University of Stellenbosch, where he obtained his law degree in 1990. He made his senior provincial debut for Western Province in 1986 against North Eastern Cape and scored a try on debut. At the end of the 1986 provincial season he formed the Western Province back row with Gert Smal and Deon Lotter, that played a major role in Western Province's Currie Cup victory. 

Strauss made his test debut for the Springboks during the 1992 tour of Britain and France, as Number 8 against France at the Stade de Gerland in  Lyon. He went on to  win 15 caps for the Springboks between 1992 and 1994, scoring 4 tries and captaining them on one occasion. He also made a record 156 appearances for Western Province during the team's golden period before he moved to Australia.

In Australia he played two seasons of rugby league with the Cronulla-Sutherland Sharks before switching back to rugby union for New South Wales. He was selected for Australia a total of 11 times, scoring a hat trick against Ireland on his debut. All but two of his caps were from the bench.  He did make a capable replacement for Toutai Kefu in the 1999 World Cup Quarter Final in Cardiff when the former was banned but it turned out to be his last cap.

Strauss returned home to South Africa and settled with his family.

Rugby union test history

Honours

Currie Cup: Winner (with Western Province) 1986, 1989 (shared). Finalist 1995

World Cup: Winner (with Wallabies) 1999

See also

List of South Africa national rugby union players – Springbok no. 579

List of Australia national rugby union players – no. 752

References

External links

 http://www.africapewines.com/about.htm
Tiaan Strauss at yesterdaydhero.com.au
 http://www.sporting-heroes.net/rugby-heroes/displayhero.asp?HeroID=2247
 :fr:Tiaan Strauss (in French)
 http://www.scrum.com/1200_1205.php?player=10544&includeref=dynamic
 https://web.archive.org/web/20131216155221/http://www.genslin.us/bokke/SARugby.html

1965 births
Living people
Afrikaner people
South African people of German descent
People from Upington
South African rugby union players
South Africa international rugby union players
South African rugby league players
Cronulla-Sutherland Sharks players
Australia international rugby union players
Rugby union number eights
Rugby union players from the Northern Cape
Western Province (rugby union) players
New South Wales Waratahs players